Maksim Vadimovich Sukhomlinov (born 9 September 1998) is a Russian football player. He plays for FC Sokol Saratov.

Club career
He made his debut in the Russian Football National League for FC Yenisey Krasnoyarsk on 8 August 2020 in a game against FC Dynamo Bryansk, as a starter.

References

External links
 
 Profile by Russian Football National League
 

1998 births
Sportspeople from Rostov-on-Don
Living people
Russian footballers
Association football defenders
FC Rostov players
FC Yenisey Krasnoyarsk players
FC Akron Tolyatti players
FC Olimp-Dolgoprudny players
FC Rotor Volgograd players
FC Sokol Saratov players
Russian First League players
Russian Second League players